Awbana River is a creek originating from a source in Mgbidi, Imo State. Awbana drains into Oguta lake

Pictures of Awbana River

References

Rivers of Nigeria